Middleton is a village and civil parish in the City of Lancaster in Lancashire, England, between Heysham and Overton. It had a population of 705 in 2011.

Middleton was the location of Middleton Tower Holiday Camp, which opened in 1939. The camp was owned by Pontin's from July 1955 until its closure in October 1994. By 2008, the holiday camp had been redeveloped as a gated community with bungalows and flats.

Notable villagers
William Lionel Clause, landscape artist (born at Middleton, 1887)

See also

Listed buildings in Middleton, Lancashire

References

External links

Geography of the City of Lancaster
Villages in Lancashire
Civil parishes in Lancashire